Lawrence County Courthouse is a historic courthouse building located at New Castle, Lawrence County, Pennsylvania.  The original building was built between 1850 and 1855, and is a two-story, six bay by three bay Greek Revival style structure.  It features a portico with six Ionic order columns and a cupola.  Major additions to the original structure were built in 1885–1886, 1914 (extended in 1939), and 1943–1944.  A small addition to connect the 1885-1886 and 1914-1939 additions was built in 1947.

It was added to the National Register of Historic Places in 1978.

See also
 List of state and county courthouses in Pennsylvania

References

County courthouses in Pennsylvania
Courthouses on the National Register of Historic Places in Pennsylvania
Greek Revival architecture in Pennsylvania
Government buildings completed in 1855
Buildings and structures in Lawrence County, Pennsylvania
New Castle, Pennsylvania
National Register of Historic Places in Lawrence County, Pennsylvania